The Agpeya (Coptic: Ϯⲁⲅⲡⲓⲁ) is the Coptic Christian "Prayer Book of the Hours" or breviary, and is equivalent to the Shehimo in the Indian Orthodox Church (another Oriental Orthodox Christian denomination), as well as the Byzantine Horologion and Roman Liturgy of the Hours used by the Eastern Orthodox Churches and Roman Catholic Church, respectively. The vast majority of the Coptic Christians learn the recitation and prayers of the Agpeya at an early age as children at home from their families. The Coptic Orthodox cycle of canonical hours is primarily composed of psalm readings from the Old Testament and gospel readings from the New Testament, with some added hymns of praise, troparia (known as "قطع" in the contemporary Arabic Agpeya and as "preces" or "litanies" in English), and other prayers.

Prostrations to God are a cornerstone in praying the Agpeya, with the breviary requiring "prostrating three times in the name of the Trinity; at the end of each Psalm … while saying the ‘Alleluia’; and multiple times" during the forty-one Kyrie eleisons (believers may use the mequteria to count these metanoias).

It includes seven canonical hours, with an additional "Prayer of the Veil" which is usually recited by Bishops, Priests, and Monks. The Coptic terms for 'Matins' and 'Vespers' are 'The Morning Raising of Incense' and 'The Evening Raising of Incense' respectively, with reference to prayers rising to God.

Before praying the Agpeya, Coptic Christians wash their hands and face in order to be clean before and present their best to God; shoes are removed in order to acknowledge that one is offering prayer before a holy God. While praying the Agpeya, many believers hold a cross in their hand during the parts where the believer is standing (during which he/she extends his/her arms in the orans position).

History
The Coptic Orthodox Church teaches that the seven fixed prayer times of the Agpeya have their origin in the Apostolic Age. The twelve psalms in each canonical hour are said to be delivered by an angel, who "recited eleven Psalms with a very nice tune, then added certain individual prayers" and "ended his worship by reciting an additional Psalm." Church Father John Cassian recorded that the Agpeya was prayed well before the rise of Christian monasticism, being "an ecumenical law to be observed by all the believers."

Canonical hours

The hours are chronologically laid out, each containing a theme corresponding to events in the life of Jesus Christ:
Prime (Morning Raising of Incense) is said at 6 am, upon awaking up in the morning or after the Midnight Praise the previous night. It symbolises Jesus Christ's incarnation and Resurrection. 
Terce (9 am) reminds us of three events, Christ’s trial by Pilate, his ascension to the heavens and the descent of the Holy Spirit upon the disciples at Pentecost.
Sext (noon) commemorates the Passion of Christ.
Terce and Sext are prayed before each Divine Liturgy.  
None (3 pm) commemorates the death of Christ on the Cross. This hour is also recited during fasting days.  
Vespers (6 pm, Evening Raising of Incense), prayed at sunset (around 5 pm), commemorates the taking down of Christ from the Cross.  
Compline (9 pm - before bedtime) commemorates the burial of Christ, and the Final Judgment. 
Vespers and Compline are both recited before the Liturgy during Lent and the fast of Nineveh.  
The  "Cetar" or "Veil" is usually recited by bishops, priests and monks, as a form of the examination of conscience. Some individuals and families also elect to  recite it as a part of their daily devotions at home. 
The Midnight Praise (said at 12 am, in the early morning before dawn) commemorates the Second Coming of Christ. It consists of three watches, corresponding to the three stages of Christ's prayer in the Garden of Gethsemane.

Structure

Every one of the Hours follows the same basic outline:
 Introduction, which includes the Lord’s Prayer
 Prayer of Thanksgiving 
 Psalm 51 (It is referred to as Psalm 50 according to the Septuagint).
 Various Psalms
 A reading from the Holy Gospel
 Short Litanies  
 "Lord Have Mercy" is then chanted 41 times (This represents the 39 lashes Jesus Christ received before the crucifixion, plus one for the crown of thorns, plus one for the spear in his side.)
 Prayers 
 Absolution
 Conclusion

Translation
Most of the Copts tend to recite the "contemporary" Agpeya prayers or parts thereof in Arabic; however, its English translations are also available in print and digital format for Copts living in English-speaking countries, and a French translation is also available.  The British scholar O.H.E. Burmester edited and published a scholastic work based on a "historical" Agpeya dated to the 13th/14th century AD, "The Horologion of the Egyptian Church", in Egypt in 1973. It was published in two versions, a trilingual "English, Coptic and Arabic" version and a "Coptic only" version. A bilingual contemporary "Coptic and Arabic" Agpeya was also edited and published in Egypt in 1975 by S. Pisada. A  contemporary Agpeya in "Coptic-only" - dedicated to the Theotokos Saint Mary in commemoration of the apparitions of our Lady of Zeitoun - was edited by E. Rizkalla, and published in the USA in 2014. A bilingual English-Coptic contemporary Agpeya was also published in the USA in 2015.

See also 
 

Shehimo

References

External links
 English versions of the Agpeya prayers both written and chanted
 Arabic, English, French texts of the Agbeya

Coptic Orthodox Church
Breviaries
Christian prayer books